The crimson-crowned fruit dove (Ptilinopus porphyraceus) is a species of bird in the family Columbidae. It is found in American Samoa, Fiji, Marshall Islands, Niue, Samoa, Tonga, and Wallis and Futuna Islands. Its natural habitats are subtropical or tropical moist lowland forest and subtropical or tropical mangrove forest.

Taxonomy and systematics 
Until 2016, both the purple-capped fruit dove and the  Kosrae fruit dove were also considered as subspecies of the crimson-crowned fruit dove. The crimson-crowned fruit dove has two remaining sub-species:
 P. p. porphyraceus - (Temminck, 1821): Found on Niue, Tonga and Fiji Islands
 P. p. fasciatus - Peale, 1848: Found on Samoa

References

crimson-crowned fruit dove
Birds of Fiji
Birds of Tonga
Birds of the Pacific Ocean
crimson-crowned fruit dove
Taxonomy articles created by Polbot
Taxa named by Coenraad Jacob Temminck